National Primary Route 22, or just Route 22 (or ) is a National Road Route of Costa Rica, located in the San José province. It is also known as Radial Colón.

Description
In San José province the route covers Mora canton (Colón district), Santa Ana canton (Piedades, Brasil districts).

References

Highways in Costa Rica